Bárbara Micheline do Monte Barbosa (born 4 July 1988), commonly known as Bárbara, is a Brazilian footballer who plays as a goalkeeper for Kindermann and the Brazil women's national football team. Bárbara has played for clubs in Italy, Sweden and Germany, as well as in her native Brazil. Since making her national team debut in 2007, she has won over 30 caps for Brazil. She has been part of her country's squad at four editions of the FIFA Women's World Cup and at two Olympic football tournaments.

Club career
In autumn 2008, Bárbara joined Italian club Napoli. She moved to Swedish Damallsvenskan team Sunnanå SK in early 2009 and remained for two seasons until the club was relegated at the end of the 2010 campaign. She rejected offers from other Swedish teams to return to the women's section of Sport Club do Recife, where her career began.  Bárbara played four league matches for Frauen-Bundesliga club BV Cloppenburg in the 2013–14 season.

International career
At the 2006 FIFA U-20 Women's World Championship, FIFA.com reported that Bárbara's goalkeeping was a "key factor" in the Brazilian team, which finished third. In September 2007 Bárbara made her senior international debut in Brazil's 2–1 friendly defeat by Japan at Fukuda Denshi Arena, Chiba. She was called into Brazil's squad for the 2007 Pan American Games, where she understudied veteran Andréia Suntaque.

Bárbara was Brazil's first-choice goalkeeper at the 2008 Beijing Olympics. She won a silver medal when Brazil lost the final 1–0 after extra time to the United States. After the final, Bárbara gave an insight into Brazilian women's football's lack of development when she revealed her club had not paid her for six months.

Bárbara was part of the Brazilian World Cup squads in 2011, 2015 and 2019.

Personal life

Bárbara is openly lesbian, having a relationship with her partner Lidiane.

References

External links

 
 Bárbara Micheline do Monte Barbosa – FIFA World Cup profile
 

1988 births
Living people
Brazilian women's footballers
Women's association football goalkeepers
Sportspeople from Recife
Olympic footballers of Brazil
Olympic silver medalists for Brazil
Footballers at the 2008 Summer Olympics
Footballers at the 2012 Summer Olympics
Expatriate women's footballers in Sweden
Expatriate women's footballers in Italy
Expatriate women's footballers in Germany
2007 FIFA Women's World Cup players
2011 FIFA Women's World Cup players
2015 FIFA Women's World Cup players
Footballers at the 2016 Summer Olympics
Olympic medalists in football
Medalists at the 2008 Summer Olympics
Brazil women's international footballers
Brazilian expatriate women's footballers
Brazilian expatriate sportspeople in Germany
Brazilian expatriate sportspeople in Italy
Brazilian expatriate sportspeople in Sweden
Sunnanå SK players
Damallsvenskan players
Pan American Games gold medalists for Brazil
Pan American Games silver medalists for Brazil
Pan American Games medalists in football
Footballers at the 2007 Pan American Games
Footballers at the 2011 Pan American Games
Universiade bronze medalists for Brazil
Universiade medalists in football
2019 FIFA Women's World Cup players
Brazilian LGBT sportspeople
LGBT association football players
Medalists at the 2007 Pan American Games
Medalists at the 2011 Pan American Games
S.S.D. Napoli Femminile players
Sociedade Esportiva Kindermann players
Footballers at the 2020 Summer Olympics
21st-century Brazilian LGBT people

Lesbian sportswomen